Surkhi is a small village in Obra Block in Aurangabad District in Bihar, India. Surkhi is under Sonahuli Panchayat.

Demographics
The total population of the village is 1,067. The number of households in Surkhi is 127. Female to male ratio of Surkhi is 95.06% compared to the Bihar's female to male ratio 91.93%. The literacy rate of the village is 74.47% compared to the literacy rate of state 47%.The female literacy rate is 65.8%. The male literacy rate is 79.46%. The total working population is 24.94% of the total population. 47.09% of the men are working population. 2.38% of the women are working population. The main working population is 19.06% of the total population. 37.3% of the men are main working population. 0.48% of the women are main working population. While the marginal working population is 5.88% of the total population. 9.79% of the men are marginal working population. 1.9% of the women are marginal working population. The total non-working population is 75.06% of the total population. 52.91% of the men are non-working population. 97.62% of the women are non-working population.

Transportation
Surkhi is reachable by Anugraha Narayan Road railway station.

Notable persons from Surkhi include
 Er. Surendra Pandey

Geography
Surkhi is situated in the eastern part of India. River Punpun is flown just 1 km north from the village.
Surkhi is situated on the River Adri. Obra, Barun, Aurangabad, Daudnagar, are the nearby towns to Surkhi.

Economy
The economy of Surkhi is mainly dependent in agriculture.

Education
Schools include:

Rajkiyekrith prathmic vidyalaya.
Adarsh High School.
Adarsh Inter College

Villages in Aurangabad district, Bihar